is a Japanese professional football club based in Yokohama, Kanagawa Prefecture, part of the Greater Tokyo Area. The club competes in the J1 League, which is the top tier of football in the country.

Having won the J-League title five times and finishing second twice, they are one of the most successful J-League clubs. The team is based in Yokohama and was founded as the company team of Nissan Motor. The club was formed by the merger of Yokohama Marinos and Yokohama Flügels in 1999. The current name is intended to reflect both Marinos and Flügels. The team name Marinos means "sailors" in Spanish. Yokohama F. Marinos is the longest serving team in the top flight of Japanese football, having played at the top level since 1982, also making them, along with Kashima Antlers, one of only two teams to have competed in Japan's top flight of football every year since its inception.

History

Nissan FC 
The team traces its origins to 1972, as the Nissan Motor Football Club, based in Yokohama. Nissan FC won promotion to Division 2 Football League in 1976. Under coach Shu Kamo, the team won Japan Soccer League in 1988 and 1989, as well as the JSL Cup in 1988, 1989 and 1990 and the Emperor's Cup in 1983, 1985, 1988, 1989 and 1991. The 1989 team won the "Triple Crown" - all three major tournaments in Japan - with legends such as Takashi Mizunuma, Kazushi Kimura and Masami Ihara. At the end of the 1991-92 season, the team won the Asian Cup Winners' Cup.

Yokohama Marinos 
Nissan Motors obtained registration in the newly formed J-League to acquire professional club status and changed the club's name to Yokohama Marinos, a reference to Yokohama's status as a major port city. In their first seasons as a professional team, Yokohama Marinos continued to win competitions: triumphant in the Emperor's Cup 1992, a second consecutive Asian Cup Winners' Cup, and their first national title in 1995. Matches between Yokohama Marinos and Verdy Kawasaki were known as the National Derby.

Yokohama F. Marinos 

In 1999, the club was renamed Yokohama F Marinos after the technical and financial merger with Yokohama Flügels that declared bankruptcy and since then an F has been added to the name to represent the Flügels half of the club. Because of that, many Flügels fans have rejected the new team. Flügels fans felt that their team was dissolved into the F Marinos, rather than being merged with. As a result, they refused to follow F. Marinos and instead created Yokohama FC, the new city-wide rival of F. Marinos, with the help of public donations and an affiliation with IMG, a talent agency company.

In 2000 Marinos was runner-up in the J-League and Shunsuke Nakamura was named the best player of the season.

In 2001 Marinos won the Japanese League Cup.

In 2003 and 2004 Marinos was a two-time J-League champion with the stars of the team being South Koreans Ahn Jung-hwan, Yoo sang-chul and Japanese players Daisuke Oku, Tatsuhiko Kubo and Yuji Nakazawa was the best player of the year 2004. The coach was the Japanese Takeshi Okada and he was named the best coach of the Japanese League in the years 2003 and 2004.

And from 2005 to 2008 with Hayuma Tanaka, Hideo Oshima, Daisuke Sakata and Koji Yamase, Marinos didn't achieve anything, the most they reached was the 2008 Emperor's Cup semi-final.

In 2010, Shunsuke Nakamura returned to Yokohama F. Marinos.

In August 4, 2011, a year after leaving the club, former Marinos player Naoki Matsuda collapsed during training with Matsumoto Yamaga FC due to cardiac arrest and died at the age of 34. As a result, his former number 3 has been retired.

And after two semi-final defeats in 2011 and 2012 and Marinos won the 2013 Emperor's Cup on New Year's Day 2014, the first after 21 years and in 2013, they were runner-up in the J-League.

On 20 May 2014, it was announced that the City Football Group, a Manchester City company, had invested in a minority stake in Yokohama F. Marinos, creating a partnership with the football club and the automaker Nissan.

And after consecutive defeats, such as a loss in the 2017 Emperor's Cup Final and in the 2018 J.League Cup Final, the team managed to get a good shape thanks to the direction of the Australian coach Ange Postecoglou, which ended 15 years of drought by winning the 2019 J1 League title, with emphasis on the participation of Teruhito Nakagawa being the best player of the season and top scorer with 15 goals together with Marcos Júnior.

In 2020, Marinos made it out of the group stage for the first time since the AFC Champions League switched to the current format.

Stadiums
 
 
The team's home stadiums are Nissan Stadium, otherwise known as International Stadium Yokohama, and Mitsuzawa Stadium. The team trained at Marinos Town located in the area of Minato Mirai, but moved to Kozukue Field located next to the home ground in 2016.

Theme song 
The club's official theme song is "We Are F. Marinos" by Japanese duo Yuzu. The song was first released in 2005, with the song being used at games up to today, sometimes having mascot Marinos-kun dance to the song on a pedestal on the running track of Nissan Stadium.

Players and staff

Current squad

The official club website lists the club mascot as player #0 and the supporters as player #12.

Out on loan

Retired number

Reserve squad (U-18s)

Current staff
For the 2022 season.

International players
This list includes players that were called-up to their national teams while playing at Yokohama F. Marinos, either to participate in official or friendly competitions, friendly matches or in training camps.

Club captains
 Shigetatsu Matsunaga 1993
 Masami Ihara 1994–1998
 Yoshiharu Ueno 1999–2000
 Norio Omura 2001
 Naoki Matsuda 2002–2003
 Daisuke Oku 2004
 Naoki Matsuda 2005–2006
 Yuji Nakazawa 2007
 Ryuji Kawai 2008–2009
 Yuzo Kurihara 2010 
 Shunsuke Nakamura 2011–2016
 Manabu Saito 2017
 Yuji Nakazawa 2018
 Takuya Kida 2019–present

Kits and crests 
Yokohama F. Marinos utilizes a three colour system composed of blue, white and red.

In 2012, Yokohama F. Marinos have unveiled a special edition 20th Anniversary jersey

Slogan

Kit suppliers and shirt sponsors

Uniforms

Players who played in the World Cup 
The list includes players who were called-up to their national teams while playing at Yokohama F. Marinos, to represent their country in the FIFA World Cup .

 1994 FIFA World Cup: Ramón Medina Bello
 1998 FIFA World Cup: Masami Ihara, Shoji Jo, Yoshikatsu Kawaguchi, Norio Omura
 2002 FIFA World Cup: Naoki Matsuda
 2006 FIFA World Cup: Yuji Nakazawa
 2010 FIFA World Cup: Yuji Nakazawa, Shunsuke Nakamura
 2014 FIFA World Cup: Manabu Saito
 2018 FIFA World Cup: Milos Degenek
 2022 FIFA World Cup: None

Record

Key

Honours

National

League
Japan Soccer League/J1 League
Champions (7): 1988–89, 1989–90, 1995, 2003, 2004, 2019, 2022

Cups
Emperor's Cup
Winners (7):  1983, 1985, 1988, 1989, 1991 1992, 2013
Japan Soccer League Cup/J.League Cup
Winners (4):  1988, 1989, 1990, 2001
Japanese Super Cup
Winners (1): 2023
All Japan Senior Football Championship
Winners (1): 1976

International
Asian Cup Winners' Cup
Winners (2): 1991-92, 1992–93

Continental record

Awards

J.League MVP Award:
 Shunsuke Nakamura (2000; 2013)
 Yuji Nakazawa (2004)
 Teruhito Nakagawa (2019)
 Tomoki Iwata (2002)

J.League Top Scorer:
 Ramón Díaz (1993)
 Teruhito Nakagawa (2019)
 Marcos Júnior (2019)
 Daizen Maeda (2021)

J.League Rookie of the Year:
 Yoshikatsu Kawaguchi (1995)
 Daisuke Nasu (2003)
 Kazuma Watanabe (2009)

J.League Manager of the Year:
 Takeshi Okada (2003; 2004)
 Ange Postecoglou (2019)
 Kevin Muscat (2022)

J.League Fair Play Award:
 Daisuke Sakata (2007)
 Yuji Nakazawa (2015; 2017)

J.League Monthly MVP :
 Shunsuke Nakamura (March 2013)
 Tetsuya Enomoto (October 2013)
 Manabu Saito (August 2015) 
 Shunsuke Nakamura (October 2015) 
 Manabu Saito (October 2016; November 2016) 
 Yuji Nakazawa (June 2017) 
 Takuya Kida (May 2019) 
 Teruhito Nakagawa (October 2019) 
 Erik (September 2020)
 Leo Ceara (August 2021)
 Kota Mizunuma (June 2022)
 Tomoki Iwata (September 2022)

J.League Best XI:
 1993: Shigetatsu Matsunaga, Masami Ihara, Ramón Díaz
 1994: Masami Ihara
 1995: Masami Ihara, Masaharu Suzuki
 1996: Masami Ihara
 1997: Masami Ihara
 1999: Shunsuke Nakamura
 2000: Naoki Matsuda, Shunsuke Nakamura
 2002: Naoki Matsuda
 2003: Yuji Nakazawa, Daisuke Oku, Tatsuhiko Kubo, Dutra
 2004: Yuji Nakazawa, Daisuke Oku, Dutra
 2005: Yuji Nakazawa
 2008: Yuji Nakazawa
 2013: Yuji Nakazawa, Shunsuke Nakamura
 2019: Teruhito Nakagawa, Marcos Júnior, Takuya Kida, Thiago Martins
 2021: Daizen Maeda
 2022: Elber, Kota Mizunuma,Tomoki Iwata,Ryuta Koike,Yohei Takaoka

AFC Champions League Best XI:
 2020: Takuya Kida, Teruhito Nakagawa

J.League Cup MVP:
 2001: Tatsuya Enomoto

J.League Cup New Hero:
 2013: Manabu Saito
 2018: Keita Endo

Manager history

In popular culture
In the manga series – Captain Tsubasa, one of the characters was Yokohama Marinos midfielder Mamoru Izawa.

Notes

Rivalries 

National Derby
 During the late 80's and early 90's, the matches between the two most winning teams of the time, Yokohama Marinos and Verdy Kawasaki, were earlier as a National Derby, but in the following years this classic gradually lost and ceasing to be the center of consideration, especially after Verdy moved to Toques and ceased to be Yomiuri's property in 1997.

Kanagawa Derby
 This is the derby played by the Kanagawa prefecture teams, currently the most important match is that of Yokohama F. Marinos and Kawasaki Frontale. Other teams evaluated for this classic are Shonan Bellmare, Yokohama FC, YSCC Yokohama.
Previously, Verdy Kawasaki and the extinct Yokohama Flügels were part of that.

Yokohama Derby
 The classic among the most representative teams in the city of Yokohama, Yokohama F. Marinos, Yokohama FC and YSCC Yokohama. Between 1993 and 1998, the Yokohama derby corresponded only to the departure between the late Yokohama Flügels and Yokohama F. Marinos.

Base categories 
The base category of Yokohama F. Marinos started in 1986, before the opening of the J-League, and it is divided into 3 categories U-12, U-15 and U-18 and these are some of the best players formed at the base of Marinos, Shunsuke Nakamura, Manabu Saito, Jungo Fujimoto, Mike Havenaar, Hiroki Iikura, Takashi Amano, Hiroyuki Taniguchi, Tetsuya Enomoto, Yuzo Kurihara, Hayuma Tanaka, Yuki Kaneko, Daisuke Sakata, Naohiro Ishikawa, Rikizo Matsuhashi, Eitaro Matsuda, Kota Yamada, Keita Endo, Ryo Takano, Takuya Kida, Andrew Kumagai, Yuji Ono, Jun Amano, Sho Matsumoto, Jin Hanato, Kota Mizunuma, Takashi Kanai, Masakazu Tashiro, Yota Akimoto etc. ...
.
All Japan Club Youth Soccer Tournament
JFA Prince League Kanto
Prince Takamado Trophy 
J-Youth Cup
JFA Championship
Danone Nations Cup

External links

  
 Yokohama F. Marinos at J.League

Notes

References

 
J.League clubs
Japan Soccer League clubs
Football clubs in Japan
Nissan
Association football clubs established in 1972
Sports teams in Yokohama
Emperor's Cup winners
Japanese League Cup winners
1972 establishments in Japan
Asian Cup Winners Cup winning clubs